Merry Maids is an international franchisor which sells and supports residential cleaning services franchises throughout the United States, Canada and the United Kingdom. Merry Maids was founded in 1979, and was acquired with ServiceMaster in 1988. In 2007, the company had over 8,000 employees.

Organizational structure
Merry Maids has 1,400 independently owned and operated franchises worldwide. It is a subsidiary of ServiceMaster.

History

Timeline
 1979 – Merry Maids was founded in Omaha, Nebraska by Dallen Peterson. Dallen worked with his family to create the company's system and franchise the company.
 1988 – ServiceMaster Brands purchases Merry Maids.

Safety record
In 2015, Merry Maids was awarded the Governor’s Award for Safety Excellence by the U.S. state of Pennsylvania, with a record of no work-related injuries for over 1,580 days and no work-related fatalities in 23 years of operation.

Labor relations
Several Merry Maids franchisees in the United States have been sued by their employees and by United States federal agencies for labor law violations. In 2015, the United States Court of Appeals for the First Circuit upheld an unfair labor practice order issued by the National Labor Relations Board (NLRB) against a Merry Maids franchisee, Merry Maids of Boston, in a dispute over the right of a labor union to hold a union representation election among its employees. The First Circuit ruled that the NLRB had jurisdiction in the case, and rejected the franchisee's claim that the behavior of certain employees made a fair election impossible.

See also
 List of cleaning companies

References

External links
Official Website

Franchises
American companies established in 1979
Business services companies established in 1979
Cleaning companies of the United States
Companies based in Memphis, Tennessee